Courts of Florida include:
;State courts of Florida
Florida Supreme Court
District courts of appeal (5 districts)
Circuit courts (20 judicial circuits)
County courts (67 courts, one for each county)

Federal courts located in Florida
United States District Court for the Northern District of Florida
United States District Court for the Middle District of Florida
United States District Court for the Southern District of Florida

Former federal courts of Florida
United States District Court for the District of Florida (extinct, subdivided)

References

See also
 Florida State Courts System

External links
National Center for State Courts – directory of state court websites.

Courts in the United States